was a Japanese politician. He was born in Miyazu, Kyoto Prefecture. He was the first president of Keijō Imperial University in Seoul, Korea, from May to July 1924 during the period when Korea was under Japanese rule. He was mayor of Yokohama from 1925 to 1931.

See also 
 Keijō Imperial University
 Shimooka Chūji

1873 births
1947 deaths
Mayors of Yokohama
University of Tokyo alumni
Governors of Kanagawa Prefecture